Candelariella efflorescens, commonly known as the powdery goldfleck lichen,  is a species of lichen in the family Candelariaceae. Found in North America, it was formally described as a new species in 1978 by Richard C. Harris and William R. Buck. The type specimen was collected by the second author from Hog Island Point State Forest Campground (Michigan, USA); here, at the edge of a swamp, it was found growing on Populus balsamifera. The lichen has a temperate eastern North American distribution. Although it occurs most frequently on bark (usually from deciduous trees), it has also occasionally been recorded growing on wood. Before its description as a new species, it had most often been confused with Candelariella xanthostigma, Candelariella concolor var. effusa, and Lepraria candelaris when well developed.

References

efflorescens
Lichen species
Lichens described in 1978
Lichens of North America